The 1943 Maine Black Bears football team was an American football team that represented the University of Maine during the 1943 college football season. In its only season under head coach Samuel Sezak, the team played one game, losing 6–20 against Phillips Andover. Richard Morrill was team captain.

Schedule

References

Maine
Maine Black Bears football seasons
College football winless seasons
Maine Black Bears football